Bulandshahr Lok Sabha constituency is one of the 80 Lok Sabha (parliamentary) constituencies in Uttar Pradesh state in India.

Assembly segments
After delimitation (2008), this Lok Sabha constituency comprises the following five Vidhan Sabha segments:

Members of Parliament
In the 1st and 2nd Lok Sabha, Bulandshahr constituency had 2 Member of Parliament (MP). Since 1962, it has only 1 MP.

Election results

See also
 Bulandshahr district

Notes

Lok Sabha constituencies in Uttar Pradesh
Politics of Bulandshahr district